Lauren Ashley Gibson (born August 19, 1991) is an American softball player.

Personal life 

Gibson's hometown is Pasadena, Maryland. Her parents are Steve and Lorrie Gibson, and she has an older sister named Danielle.

Amateur softball career 

She attended Chesapeake High School (Anne Arundel County) where she played softball, basketball, and soccer. Gibson led the Chesapeake softball team to 2 consecutive class 4A state championships, pitching no-hitters in both games. Currently, she attends the College of Agricultural Sciences and Natural Resources at University of Tennessee. Gibson was chosen as a NFCA first-team All-American in 2011, after winning the SEC batting title with a .420 average. In 2012 after leading the Lady Vols to the Women's College World Series, she was once again chosen as a NFCA first-team All-American at second base.
Gibson was chosen as the Co-SEC Player of the Week for the week of March 11, 2013. She earned this honor after hitting .500 with three home runs against No. 3/3 Florida and Winthrop. She won the 2013 SEC Player of the Year award following the end of the season.

Team USA 

Gibson has been a member of Team USA since 2011. With the United States women's national softball team she won the 2011 World Cup of Softball. Gibson led team USA in 2012 with a .500 batting average. She also hit 5 home-runs and tallied 18 RBIs in 22 games in 2012.

References

External links 
 
 USA Softball

1991 births
People from Pasadena, Maryland
Living people
Softball players from Maryland
Softball players at the 2011 Pan American Games
Tennessee Volunteers softball players
Softball players at the 2015 Pan American Games
Pan American Games gold medalists for the United States
Pan American Games silver medalists for the United States
Pan American Games medalists in softball
Sportspeople from Anne Arundel County, Maryland
University of Tennessee alumni
Medalists at the 2011 Pan American Games